Borbo fatuellus, the long horned swift, long horned skipper or foolish swift, is a butterfly of the family Hesperiidae. It is found in tropical Africa and south-western Arabia. The habitat consists of wet forests, moist woodland and coastal bush.

The wingspan is 33–42 mm for males and 40–43 mm for females. Adults are on wing year-round, but are more common from October to May in southern Africa.

The larvae feed on Ehrharta erecta, Setaria sulcata, Setaria megaphylla, Imperata cylindrica, Pennisetum, Panicum and Digitaria species.

Subspecies
Borbo fatuellus fatuellus (Sub-Saharan Africa, including Senegal, Gambia, Guinea-Bissau, Guinea, Sierra Leone, Liberia, Ivory Coast, Ghana, Togo, Nigeria, Cameroon, Bioko, Zambia, Mozambique, Zimbabwe, northern Botswana, northern Namibia, Yemen, South Africa: coastal lowland forests and wooded Savannah from the Eastern Cape to Eswatini and along the coast to northern KwaZulu-Natal, Mpumalanga and the Limpopo Province and the further north)
Borbo fatuellus dolens (Mabille, 1898) (Comoro Islands)
Borbo fatuellus thomea (Evans, 1937) (São Tomé and Príncipe)

References

Butterflies described in 1855
Hesperiinae